Casey Crosby (born September 17, 1988) is an American professional baseball pitcher who is currently a free agent. He played in Major League Baseball (MLB) for the Detroit Tigers.

Professional career

Detroit Tigers
Crosby was drafted by the Detroit Tigers in the fifth round of the 2007 Major League Baseball Draft out of Kaneland High School. Prior to the 2010 season, he was considered the 47th best prospect in baseball by Baseball America.

Crosby was added to the Tigers 40 man roster on November 18, 2011.

Despite suffering two elbow injuries, Crosby pitched for the Toledo Mud Hens, the Tigers' Triple-A affiliate.

Crosby made his major league debut on June 1, 2012, against the New York Yankees. He got his first career strikeout against the former Tigers player Curtis Granderson. In the second inning, Crosby issued four walks followed by a grand slam by Granderson. Crosby pitched 3 innings and got his first career loss. On June 7, Crosby gained his first major league win after giving up three runs in 5 innings, as the Tigers defeated the Cleveland Indians 7–5.

On August 11, 2014, Crosby was released by the Tigers to make room for Kevin Whelan on their 40-man roster following a 19 inning game against the Toronto Blue Jays. Crosby was on the Toledo disabled list at the time of his release.

Boston Red Sox
On December 23, 2014, the Boston Red Sox signed Casey Crosby to a minor league contract. He was released on April 4, 2015.

Lincoln Saltdogs
Crosby played with the Lincoln Saltdogs of the American Association of Independent Professional Baseball for the 2017 season.

Minnesota Twins
After not playing in affiliated baseball for three seasons, on October 13, 2017, Crosby signed a minor league deal with the Minnesota Twins. He became a free agent after the 2018 season.

Chicago Dogs
On May 14, 2019, Crosby signed with the Chicago Dogs of the independent American Association.

Lancaster Barnstormers
On September 4, 2019, Crosby was traded to the Lancaster Barnstormers of the Atlantic League of Professional Baseball.

Chicago Dogs (second stint)
On October 23, 2019, Crosby was traded back to the Chicago Dogs of the American Association.

Los Angeles Dodgers
On December 5, 2019, Crosby signed a minor league contract with the Los Angeles Dodgers after his video surfaced on Rob Friedman's FlatGroundApp Twitter account. Crosby was released by the Dodgers organization on July 1, 2020.

Chicago Dogs (third stint)
On July 3, 2020, Crosby re-signed with the Chicago Dogs of the American Association. On November 2, 2020, Crosby was released by the team.

References

External links

1988 births
Living people
Baseball players from Illinois
Detroit Tigers players
Erie SeaWolves players
Gulf Coast Tigers players
West Michigan Whitecaps players
Toledo Mud Hens players
People from Maple Park, Illinois
Salt River Rafters players
Major League Baseball pitchers
People from Kankakee, Illinois
Lincoln Saltdogs players
Rochester Red Wings players
Chattanooga Lookouts players
Gulf Coast Twins players
Chicago Dogs players
Lancaster Barnstormers players